The following television stations broadcast on digital channel 15 in Mexico:
 XEFB-TDT in Monterrey, Nuevo León
 XHCSA-TDT in San Cristóbal de las Casas, Chiapas
 XHCRO-TDT in Carbó, Sonora
 XHCTCY-TDT in Querétaro, Querétaro
 XHD-TDT in Tampico, Tamaulipas
 XHFA-TDT in Nogales, Sonora
 XHJGMI-TDT in Uruapan, Michoacán
 XHMEE-TDT in Mexicali, Baja California
 XHMTPU-TDT in Puebla, Puebla
 XHOCH-TDT in Ojinaga, Chihuahua
 XHOQT-TDT in Oquitoa, Sonora
 XHPOX-TDT in Pinotepa Nacional, Oaxaca
 XHRON-TDT in Rayón, Sonora 
 XHSAS-TDT in Santa Ana, Sonora
 XHSPRAG-TDT in Aguascalientes, Aguascalientes
 XHSPRZC-TDT in Zacatecas, Zacatecas
 XHTCM-TDT in Zitácuaro, Michoacán
 XHTJB-TDT in Tijuana, Baja California
 XHTV-TDT in Mexico City
 XHVTV-TDT in Matamoros, Tamaulipas

15